This article is a list of state and territorial fish and wildlife management agencies in the United States, by U.S. state or territory. These agencies are typically within the State Executive Branch. In most states these agencies manage hunting and fishing regulations, set seasons, sell fishing and hunting licenses, manage resources and provide law enforcement to protect the fish and wildlife resources of the state. Exact duties of each agency vary by state.

Alabama 
 Alabama Department of Conservation and Natural Resources

Alaska 
 Alaska Department of Fish and Game
 Alaska State Troopers, enforces Fish and Game laws.

Arizona 
 Arizona Game and Fish Department

Arkansas 
 Arkansas Game and Fish Commission

California 
 California Natural Resources Agency
 California Department of Fish and Wildlife

Colorado 
 Colorado Department of Natural Resources
 Colorado Parks and Wildlife

Connecticut 
 Connecticut Department of Energy and Environmental Protection

Delaware 
 Delaware Department of Natural Resources and Environmental Control

District of Columbia 
 Department of Energy and Environment

Florida 
 Florida Fish and Wildlife Conservation Commission

Georgia 
 Georgia Department of Natural Resources

Hawaii 
 Hawai'i Department of Land and Natural Resources

Idaho 
 Idaho Department of Fish and Game

Illinois 
 Illinois Department of Natural Resources

Indiana 
 Indiana Department of Natural Resources

Iowa 
 Iowa Department of Natural Resources

Kansas 
 Kansas Department of Wildlife, Parks and Tourism

Kentucky 
 Kentucky Department of Fish and Wildlife Resources

Louisiana 
 Louisiana Department of Wildlife and Fisheries

Maine 
 Maine Department of Inland Fisheries and Wildlife
 Maine Warden Service
 Maine Department of Marine Resources
 Maine Marine Patrol

Maryland 
 Maryland Department of Natural Resources

Massachusetts 
 Massachusetts Executive Office of Energy and Environmental Affairs (EOEEA)
 Massachusetts Department of Fish and Game

Michigan 
 Michigan Department of Natural Resources

Minnesota 
 Minnesota Department of Natural Resources

Mississippi 
 Mississippi Department of Wildlife, Fisheries, and Parks

Missouri 
 Missouri Department of Conservation

Montana 
 Montana Department of Fish, Wildlife and Parks

Nebraska 
 Nebraska Game and Parks Commission

Nevada 
 Nevada Department of Wildlife

New Hampshire 
 New Hampshire Fish and Game Department

New Jersey 
 New Jersey Department of Environmental Protection
 New Jersey Division of Fish and Wildlife

New Mexico 
 New Mexico Department of Game and Fish

New York 
 New York State Department of Environmental Conservation

North Carolina 
 North Carolina Wildlife Resources Commission

North Dakota 
 North Dakota Game and Fish Department

Northern Mariana Islands 
 CNMI Bureau of Environmental and Coastal Quality

Ohio 
 Ohio Department of Natural Resources

Oklahoma 
 Oklahoma Department of Wildlife Conservation

Oregon 
 Oregon Department of Fish and Wildlife
 Oregon State Police, enforces Fish and Game laws.

Pennsylvania 
 Pennsylvania Fish and Boat Commission
 Pennsylvania Game Commission
 Pennsylvania Department of Conservation and Natural Resources

Rhode Island 
 Rhode Island Department of Environmental Management

South Carolina 
 South Carolina Department of Natural Resources

South Dakota 
 South Dakota Department of Game, Fish, and Parks

Tennessee 
 Tennessee Wildlife Resources Agency

Texas 
 Texas Parks and Wildlife Department

Utah 
 Utah Department of Natural Resources
 Utah Division of Wildlife Resources

Vermont 
 Vermont Agency of Natural Resources
 Vermont Department of Fish and Wildlife

Virginia 
 Virginia Department of Wildlife Resources
 Virginia Marine Resources Commission

Washington (state) 
 Washington State Department of Natural Resources
 Washington State Department of Fish and Wildlife

West Virginia 
 West Virginia Division of Natural Resources

Wisconsin 
 Wisconsin Department of Natural Resources

Wyoming 
 Wyoming Game and Fish Department

See also 
United States Fish and Wildlife Service
National Oceanic and Atmospheric Administration
National Ocean Service
National Marine Fisheries Service
National Oceanic and Atmospheric Administration Fisheries Office of Law Enforcement

References

External links 
State Wildlife Agencies List - U.S. Fish and Wildlife Service
Association of Fish and Wildlife Agencies

Agencies
States of the United States-related lists
Environmental
Natural resources agencies in the United States